Sphenomorphus tanahtinggi  is a species of skink found in Malaysia.

References

tanahtinggi
Reptiles described in 2001
Reptiles of Borneo